William Ira Winstanley (26 October 1911 – 1985) was an English footballer who played in the Football League for Stoke City.

Career
Winstanley was born in Prestwich and played for Cheshire League side Altrincham before earning a move to Stoke City in 1935. He made an instant impression on new manager Bob McGrory he played 31 matches in 1935–36 and then 21 in 1936–37. He suffered a broken leg on Christmas Day in 1936 playing against Chelsea and he missed more than a year playing once in 1938–39. He was never able to force his way back into the first team and once World War II commenced he returned to Manchester and played for Trafford Park.

Career statistics

References

English footballers
Stoke City F.C. players
Altrincham F.C. players
English Football League players
1911 births
1985 deaths
Association football defenders